Albert Orr Bogle (born 1949) is a minister of the Church of Scotland. On 25 October 2011 he was nominated to be Moderator of the General Assembly of the Church of Scotland for 2012-2013; he was duly formally elected as Moderator on 19 May 2012 - the first day of the General Assembly's week-long annual session.

Background
Bogle was ordained as a minister of the Church of Scotland in 1981 and inducted to St Andrew's Parish Church in Bo’ness, Scotland. In 2015 he demitted his charge at Bo'ness to become a Pioneer Minister of Sanctuary First www.sanctuaryfirst.org.uk.  He continues to pioneer this worldwide ministry. He is married to Martha; the couple have a son and daughter.

He was born in Glasgow in 1949 and was educated at Woodside Secondary School, Glasgow. Following a career in banking (prior to 1975), he studied for a Bachelor of Divinity degree at the University of Glasgow. Prior to his ordination, he spent a year as Probationer at Cardonald Parish Church, Glasgow. He also studied part-time (1996–1998) at the University of Edinburgh for a postgraduate Master of Theology degree.

As well as his ministry in Bo’ness, he has served the General Assembly of the Church of Scotland in various roles since 1983. These have included membership of the Panel of Worship to being Convener of the "Church without Walls" Planning Group from 2004 to 2009. As of 2011, he is a member of the Future Strategy Group of the Church of Scotland's World Mission Council. He is known as an innovator, particularly in promoting the use of new technology within worship. He is the founder and leader of Sanctuary First, an innovative App promoting daily worship and prayer. He is a director and founder member of Sanctus Media, a not for profit production company seeking to serve the  wider Christian community and the Charitable sector.

In 2012-2013, he became the Moderator of the Church of Scotland. However, following his year, at the 2013 General Assembly, he proposed a compromise between the evangelical and liberal wings of the Church of Scotland, much to the disappointment of many evangelicals both within the denomination, and those out with it as well.

He demitted his charge from St Andrew's Bo'ness in  December 2015. He was appointed in 2016  by the Presbytery of Falkirk as Pioneer Minister of Sanctuary First an online worshipping community. In 2017 he was invited by the Princess Royal, to be her chaplain during her appointment, by the Queen as Lord High Commissioner to the General Assembly of the Church of Scotland

The Vine Trust

Bogle was the founder and is the chairman, of The Vine Trust, which was established in 1985. The Vine Trust aims to help some of the poorest children and communities around the world. The charity's Amazon Hope Project provides a health service for around 100,000 patients every year. The Vine Trust has the patronage of Anne, Princess Royal. In October 2014 the Trust made history by delivering an ex Mod Fleet Tender to Lake Victoria to provide primary medical care to some of the poorest people in the world. The Jubilee Hope left the River Clyde in Glasgow in January 2014 and  finally arrived on  Lake  Victoria in September 2014  It was launched by the Princess Royal on 2 October 2014 to begin a work that will have the potential to reach 2 million patients within the next twenty years.

External links
BBC News report, 25 October 2011
Church of Scotland press release
The Vine Trust and the Amazon Hope Project
Personal Twitter Account

References

Moderators of the General Assembly of the Church of Scotland
20th-century Ministers of the Church of Scotland
Living people
1949 births
Alumni of the University of Glasgow
Alumni of the University of Edinburgh
21st-century Ministers of the Church of Scotland